The 2022 EuroLeague Final Four was the concluding EuroLeague Final Four tournament of the 2021–22 EuroLeague season, the 65th season of Europe's premier club basketball tournament, and the 22nd season since it was first organised by Euroleague Basketball. It was the 35th Final Four of the modern EuroLeague Final Four era (1988–present), and the 37th time overall that the competition has concluded with a final four format. The venue initially selected was Berlin, Germany, however, Euroleague Basketball later announced that the Final Four would be played at the Štark Arena in Belgrade, Serbia, on 19–21 May 2022.

Venue
The Final Four was originally scheduled to be played at the Mercedes-Benz Arena in Berlin, Germany, on 27–29 May 2022. However, Euroleague Basketball announced on 4 March 2022 that the Berlin Final Four was postponed due to the pandemic situation and health measures imposed in the German capital and would be held at the Štark Arena in Belgrade, Serbia, on 19–21 May 2022.

Štark Arena also hosted the 2018 EuroLeague Final Four.

Teams

Bracket

Semifinals

Semifinal A

Semifinal B 
Efes won the game after Vasilije Micić scored a three-pointer with 0.2 seconds left on the clock, breaking the tie.

Third place game

Championship game

References

External links
Official website

Final
Basketball in Belgrade
EuroLeague Finals
International basketball competitions hosted by Serbia
Sports competitions in Belgrade
2020s in Belgrade
EuroLeague
EuroLeague Final Four